Claire Louise Evans (born 11 January 1983) is a Welsh beauty pageant titleholder who was the Miss Wales 2005.

Born the eldest child of parents Geraint and Michelle in the seaside town of Aberystwyth in Wales, she was educated at St Padarns Roman Catholic primary School and then Penglais Comprehensive School.

Evans was a Welsh International athlete, winning many Welsh championship titles over the distances of 1500 m, 3000 m, 5000 m, 10,000 m and cross country, and represented Wales at International for several years. A competitive swimmer at county level, she also holds a qualification in sports therapy. Evans's younger brother Daniel Evans, also a competitive runner, represented Wales at International level in athletics and captained his county Dyfed Schools in football. The youngest of the three siblings, Rhian Evans, did not follow the athletics path, instead opting for amateur dramatics.

In 2005, Evans was crowned Miss Wales and went on to represent Wales at Miss World in China. She was the first Miss Wales from Aberystwyth and Ceredigion. During her year-long reign, she attended many events and was appointed an Ambassador for the 2006 Heineken Cup Rugby alongside Ieuan Evans and Rob Howley. Evans and Ieuan took the Heineken Cup to the summit of Snowdon in Wales.
 
In 2007 she was placed 6th in the Miss Great Britain contest. She has appeared in several magazines and music videos and did a TV show for Sky's Living TV hosted by Tara Palmer-Tomkinson. Evans had a six-page modelling cover shoot in women's glossy fashion magazine Citta Bella in Malaysia.

In 2009, Evans won the title of Miss UK Hawaiian Tropic and represented the UK at the 2009 international finals in the autumn. In that same year, Evans successfully completed a course in London for a career as a freelance fashion, photographic and creative media makeup artist and has worked on many high-fashion shoots and for Yes London brand at London Fashion week. TV work includes BBC series Elizabeth's Wales, makeup artist for BBC's presenter Sian williams and the coverage of the Queens Jubilee Celebrations, X-Factor Rhydian Roberts show and celebrity guests, Andrew Lloyd Webber 'Finding Dorothy' West End Wizard of Oz star Sophie Evans, Jonathan show, Bryn Terfel Ysgoloriaeth and many more. Her talent for makeup artistry saw her commissioned by Universal France for the filming of French artist Garou. Travelling internationally, her recent commission was for two leading fashion brands in the Bahamas. Evans was a makeup artist for Miss England Alize Lily Mounter Miss World portfolio. From 2008 to 2009, Evans was the girlfriend of Wales Scrum half and British Lion Mike Phillips; they lived together in Penarth until their split.

References 

Living people
People from Aberystwyth
1983 births
Welsh female models
Miss United Kingdom winners
Welsh beauty pageant winners
People educated at Ysgol Penglais School
Miss World 2005 delegates